Meredith Sue Willis (born 1946 in Clarksburg, West Virginia), is a writer of short stories, novels for adults and for children, as well as non-fiction on the subject of creative writing.

Early life
Willis graduated from Barnard College in 1969 and received an MFA from the Columbia University School of the Arts in 1972.

Biography
A well-known speaker and writer about the teaching of writing, her own novels include A Space Apart, Higher Ground, Only Great Changes, Trespassers, Oradell at Sea, and Their Houses.  Her short story collections include In the Mountains of America,  Dwight's House and Other Stories, and Out of the Mountains.  Her work has been praised in  periodicals like The New York Times Book Review, The Nation, and The San Francisco Chronicle.

She has won major awards including literary fellowships from the National Endowment for the Arts and the New Jersey State Council on the Arts, and her fiction has won prizes like the PEN Syndicated Fiction Award and the West Virginia Library Association Award (1980), as well as the Chaffin Award for fiction.

An early writer-in-the-schools with Teachers and Writers Collaborative, she has turned many of her experiences teaching writing into three books for teachers and writers (Personal Fiction Writing, Deep Revision, and Blazing Pencils) and three novels for children (The Secret Super Powers of Marco, Marco's Monster, and Billie of Fish House Lane). She also wrote the highly praised how-to-write book Ten Strategies to Write Your Novel.

She is a past Distinguished Teaching Artist of the New Jersey State Council on the Arts.

Works

Novels for adults
A Space Apart (1979, 2005, 2013)
Higher Ground (1981, 1998)
Only Great Changes (1985, 1998)
Trespassers (1997)
Oradell at Sea (2002)
The City Built of Starships (2005)
Love Palace (2014)
Oradell at Sea (2014)
Their Houses (2018)

Collections of short stories

In the Mountains of America (1994)
Dwight's House and Other Stories (2004)
Out of the Mountains (2010)
Re-Visions: Stories from Stories (2011)

Novels for children and young adults

The Secret Super Powers of Marco (1994, 1995, 2001)
Marco's Monster (1996, 2001)
Billie of Fish House Lane (2006)
Meli's Way (2015)

Nonfiction about writing

Personal Fiction Writing: A Guide to Writing from Real Life for Teachers, Students, and Writers (1984, 2000)
Blazing Pencils: A Guide to Writing Fiction and Essays (1990, 2000)
Deep Revision: A Guide for Teachers, Students, and Other Writers (1993)
Ten Strategies to Write Your Novel (2010)

References

Further reading
 Sarah Dufaure, "A life of ‘Unfinished Business’: Cursed Inheritance and Blessed Heritage in Meredith Sue Willis’s Oradell at Sea," Thy Truth Then Be Thy Dowry: Questions of Inheritance in American Women’s Literature, Newcastle, Cambridge Scholars Publishing, 2014, pp. 199-211.
Keith Maillard,  "Gaining the Higher Ground: An Appreciation,” Appalachian Heritage: A Literary Magazine of the Southern Appalachians, Vol. 34, No. 4, Fall 2006, p. 38.
Nathan Leslie, “Meredith Sue Willis Interviewed by Nathan Leslie,” Main Street Rag, Volume 11, Number 1, Spring 2006.
Belinda Anderson, “Meredith Sue Willis at Ease: An Interview with the author of Oradell at Sea”  Artworks (West Virginia Division of Culture and History, The Cultural Center, 1900 Kanawha Blvd.E, Charleston, WV 25305-0300), Winter 2002-2003, p. 5.	
Gina Herring, “Politics and Men: What's ‛Really Important' About Meredith Sue Willis and Blair Ellen Morgan,” Appalachian Journal, (Appalachian State University, Boone, NC 28608), Volume 25, Number 4, Summer 1998, pp. 414–422.
Thomas E. Douglass, “A View from Higher Ground: Meredith Sue Willis and the Appalachian Renaissance,” The Iron Mountain Review: Meredith Sue Willis Issue (Department of English, Box 64, Emory & Henry College, Emory, VA 24327), Volume XII, Spring 1996, pp. 13–18.
Tal Stanley, “Making That New Place: Blair Morgan's Coming of Age and Meredith Sue Willis's Social Vision,” The Iron Mountain Review: Meredith Sue Willis Issue (Department of English, Box 64, Emory & Henry College, Emory, VA 24327), Volume XII, Spring 1996, pp. 19–25.
Jack L. Wills, “The Story's the Thing: The Power of Narrative in In the Mountains of America,” The Iron Mountain Review: Meredith Sue Willis Issue (Department of English, Box 64, Emory & Henry College, Emory, VA 24327), Volume XII, Spring 1996, pp 26–30.
Thomas E. Douglass, “Interview with Meredith Sue Willis,” Appalachian Journal (Appalachian State University, Boone, NC 28608), Volume 20, Number 2, Spring 1993, pp. 284–293.
Nancy Carol Joyner, “The Poetics of the House in Appalachian Fiction,” in The Poetics of Appalachian Space, ed. Parks Lanier, Jr., (Knoxville: University of Tennessee Press, 1991).
Barbara Melosh, “Historical Memory in Fiction: The Civil Rights Movement in Three Novels,” Radical History # 40, January 1988 (445 W. 59th St., Room 4312, New York, NY 10019), pp. 64–76.
Ken Sullivan, “Gradual Changes: Meredith Sue Willis and the New Appalachian Fiction,” Appalachian Journal 14, 1986, pp. 38–45.
Leslie Hanscom, “Looking Back Upon A Summer in VISTA; Leslie Hanscom Talks With Meredith Sue Willis,” Newsday, February 3, 1985, p. 18.

External links

 Official website
 West Virginia Wesleyan Author Page
 Appalachian Heritage Featured Author
West Virginia & Regional History Center at West Virginia University, Meredith Sue Willis papers
 Art Works Interview
 Mountain Lit: West Virginia Author Awards and Honors
 Mountain Lit: Meredith Sue Willis: Writing Her Own Dispatch
 Hamilton Stone Authors
 West Virginia Folklife Literary Map
 Teachers and Writers Collaborative
 Poets & Writers
 WV Library Commission Research Gudie
 The West Virginia Encyclopedia
 West Virginia Division of Culture and History Interview with Meredith Sue Willis
 Review of Our Houses in Southern Literary Review
 Wheeling News Register: West Virginia Native Discusses Importance of Fiction
 NFReads.com Author Feature: Meredith Sue Willis
 South Orange/Maplewood Community Interview with Meredith Sue Willis

1946 births
Living people
American children's writers
American feminist writers
American instructional writers
American women novelists
American women short story writers
Barnard College alumni
Novelists from West Virginia
Writers from Clarksburg, West Virginia
20th-century American novelists
American women children's writers
20th-century American women writers
20th-century American short story writers
American women non-fiction writers
20th-century American non-fiction writers